Latin Pop Airplay is a chart published by Billboard magazine that ranks the top-performing songs (regardless of genre or language) on Latin pop radio stations in the United States, based on weekly airplay data compiled by Nielsen's Broadcast Data Systems (BDS). It is a subchart of Hot Latin Songs, which lists the best-performing Spanish-language songs in the country. In 1998, 15 songs topped the chart, in 50 issues of the magazine. Due to damage to the BDS monitors in Puerto Rico caused by Hurricane Georges, the Latin Pop Airplay chart, along with the other Latin song charts, was not published in the issues dated October 10 and October 17. 1998 was named "The Year of the Romantic Songs" by El Nuevo Herald due to the popularity of ballads.

The first number one of the year was "En El Jardín" by Alejandro Fernández and Gloria Estefan, which had been in the top spot since the chart dated December 13, 1997. It remained in the top position for five more weeks until it was displaced by Celine Dion's "My Heart Will Go On", the theme song from the 1997 film Titanic. "My Heart Will Go On" is the second English-language song to top the chart after "I Could Fall in Love" by Selena in 1995. "No Sé Olvidar" by Fernández held this position for eight weeks and tied with Carlos Ponce's debut single "Rezo" for the longest run at number one. Ponce had established himself as a soap opera actor before becoming a musical artist.

Ricky Martin obtained his first chart-topper with his ballad "Vuelve" which was named the best-performing song of the year despite the track only having spent three weeks at number one. Martin was the first artist in the chart's history to replace himself at number one when "Perdido Sin Ti" succeeded "Vuelve". Fernández, Ponce, Martin, and Estefan were the only acts to have more than one chart-topper in 1998, with the latter being the only female artist to achieve this. Alejandro Sanz also gained his first number one with "Amiga Mía" while "Te Quiero Tanto, Tanto" by OV7, which was recorded as the theme song for the Mexican  telenovela Mi pequeña traviesa (1997), remains the group's only chart-topper. Chayanne had the final number one of the year with "Dejaría Todo".

Chart history

See also
1998 in Latin music

References

United States Latin Pop Airplay
1998
1998 in Latin music
1998 in American music